Guruh Gipsy is a 1976 Indonesian studio album released by Guruh Sukarnoputra in collaboration with the band Gipsy, consisting of Keenan Nasution, Chrisye, Roni Harahap, and Oding Nasution. Mixing modern instruments with traditional Javanese and Balinese music styles, it is now considered a landmark album. In 2007, Rolling Stone Indonesia voted it the second best Indonesian album of all time.

Production
Guruh Gipsy was produced independently; Guruh Sukarnoputra contacted Gipsy and asked them to help. Guruh wrote the songs and also played the piano and gendér. Both Chrisye and Keenan provided vocals, with Chrisye also playing the bass and Keenan on drums. Roni Harahap played the piano, Oding Nasution was on guitar, and Abadi Soesman on synthesizers. The Hutauruk Sisters provided female backing vocals.

The cover art was designed to convey a meaning. On the cover, there is the term "Dasabayu", consisting of 10 figures of Balinese script which convey meaning; I-A meaning "event", A-Ka-Sa meaning "emptiness", Ma-Ra meaning "new", La-Wa meaning "truth", and Ya-Ung meaning "eternal". Underneath is written Kesepakatan dalam Kepekatan.

Track listing

Musical style
Guruh Gipsy combines modern, Western instruments like the piano, synthesizers, and various rock instruments with traditional music forms, including Balinese gendér, Central Javanese vocal styles, and West Javanese melodies and scales.
It has been described as progressive rock and heavy pop.

Release and reception
Guruh Gipsy was released on the indie label Dela Rohita. It was well received.

Guruh Gipsy has been described as a "landmark album" and "a pillar of the Indonesian pop music industry". In December 2007, Rolling Stone Indonesia selected Guruh Gipsy as the second-best Indonesian album of all time, behind Badai Pasti Berlalu. In 2009, they selected one of the songs from the album, "Indonesia Maharddhika", as the 59th best Indonesian song of all time. The song "Chopin Larung" was also well received.

Guruh Gipsy is considered an influence for the 1990s Indonesian trend of mixing traditional instruments with pop music.

In 2006, the album was reissued by Shadoks Music on LP. According to Nasution, the release was done without the band's permission, and was pulled out of print after Nasution sent an email to Shadoks management.

References

Bibliography

1977 albums
Indonesian-language albums
Progressive rock albums by Indonesian artists